Alula may refer to:
 Alula, a part of a bird's wing
 A part of an insect's wing; see insect wing#Fields
 Al-'Ula, a region in north-western Saudi Arabia
 Ras Alula (d. 1897), Ethiopian general
 Alula (magazine), a defunct Finnish ornithological journal
 Alula (plant), a rare Hawaiian plant (Brighamia insignis)
 Alula, Somalia, a historic town in northeastern Somalia
 Alula Engida, a 19th-century Ethiopian general
 Alula Borealis, a star in the constellation Ursa Major; see Nu Ursae Majoris
 Alula Australis, a star in the constellation Ursa Major; see Xi Ursae Majoris
 Alula, a fictional character from the videogame OneShot